Rudolf Otto Sigismund Lipschitz (14 May 1832 – 7 October 1903) was a German mathematician who made contributions to mathematical analysis (where he gave his name to the Lipschitz continuity condition) and differential geometry, as well as number theory, algebras with involution and classical mechanics.

Biography
Rudolf Lipschitz was born on 14 May 1832 in Königsberg. He was the son of a landowner and was raised at his father's estate at Bönkein which was near Königsberg. He entered the University of Königsberg when he was 15, but later moved to the University of Berlin where he studied with Gustav Dirichlet. Despite having his studies delayed by illness, in 1853 Lipschitz graduated with a PhD in Berlin.

After receiving his PhD, Lipschitz started teaching at local Gymnasiums. In 1857 he married Ida Pascha, the daughter of one of the landowners with an estate near to his father's. In 1857 he earned his habilitation at the University of Bonn and remained there as a privatdozent. In 1862 Lipschitz became an extraordinary professor at the University of Breslau where he spent the following two years. In 1864 Lipschitz moved back to Bonn as a full professor. He was the first Jewish full professor at Bonn University. He was appointed Bonn's first chair of Mathematics in 1869. He remained there for the rest of his career. Here he examined the dissertation of Felix Klein. Lipschitz died on 7 October 1903 in Bonn.

Rediscovery of Clifford algebra
Lipschitz discovered Clifford algebras in 1880, two years after William K. Clifford (1845–1879) and independently of him, and he was the first to use them in the study of orthogonal transformations. Up to 1950 people mentioned "Clifford–Lipschitz numbers" when they referred to this discovery of Lipschitz. Yet Lipschitz's name suddenly disappeared from the publications involving Clifford algebras; for instance Claude Chevalley (1909–1984) gave the name "Clifford group" to an object that is never mentioned in Clifford's works, but stems from Lipschitz's. Pertti Lounesto (1945–2002) contributed greatly to recalling the importance of Lipschitz's role.

Selected publications
Lehrbuch der Analysis (two volumes, Bonn 1877, 1880); 
Wissenschaft  und Staat (Bonn, 1874); 
Untersuchungen über die Summen von Quadraten (Bonn, 1886); 
Bedeutung der theoretischen Mechanik (Berlin, 1876).

See also
 Cauchy–Lipschitz theorem
 Lipschitz domain
 Lipschitz quaternion
 Lipschitz continuity
 Uniform, Hölder and Lipschitz continuity
 Lipschitz distance
 Lipschitz-continuous maps and contractions
 Concave moduli and Lipschitz approximation
 Dini–Lipschitz criterion
 Dini–Lipschitz test

References

External links

 
 
  (digitalized document, provided without fee by Göttingen Digitalization Project, in German)

19th-century German mathematicians
1832 births
1903 deaths
Academic staff of the University of Bonn
Scientists from Königsberg
People from the Province of Prussia
Mathematical analysts